History of European Ideas is a peer-reviewed academic journal covering the intellectual history of Europe from the Renaissance onwards. It was established in 1980 and is published by Routledge. The editor-in-chief is Richard Whatmore (University of St. Andrews).

Abstracting and indexing
The journal is abstracted and indexed in:

References

External links

Routledge academic journals
English-language journals
8 times per year journals
European history journals
History of philosophy journals
European